At the Cut is a 2009 album by Vic Chesnutt. It was his penultimate album release before his death on December 25, 2009, from an overdose of muscle relaxants. The song "Flirted with You All My Life" alludes to Chesnutt's own attitude toward suicide, including his previous attempts to take his own life. Along with North Star Deserter, this album features various members from the Canadian post-rock band Thee Silver Mt. Zion Memorial Orchestra, as well as Fugazi's vocalist and guitarist Guy Picciotto.

Track listing 
All songs written by Vic Chesnutt
 "Coward" – 5:16
 "When the Bottom Fell Out" – 3:11
 "Chinaberry Tree" – 4:11
 "Chain" – 3:00
 "We Hovered with Short Wings" – 5:15
 "Philip Guston" – 3:28
 "Concord Country Jubilee" – 4:33
 "Flirted with You All My Life" – 4:42
 "It Is What It Is" – 6:59
 "Granny" – 3:25

Personnel 
Musicians
 Vic Chesnutt – guitar, vocals
 Thierry Amar – contrabass, engineering
 Chad Jones – guitar
 Efrim Menuck – guitar, keyboards, vocals, engineering
 Jessica Moss – violin, vocals
 Nadia Moss – organ, piano, vocals
 David Payant – drums, keyboards, vocals
 Guy Picciotto – guitar

Technical personnel
 Howard Bilerman – engineering
 Harris Newman of Grey Market Mastering – finalizing
 Radwan Moumneh – engineering
 Guy Picciotto – engineering

References 

2009 albums
Vic Chesnutt albums
Thee Silver Mt. Zion albums
Constellation Records (Canada) albums
Albums produced by Guy Picciotto
Collaborative albums